Indians in Turkey are a small community numbering 300 and comprising roughly 100 families. Most of them work as doctors and computer engineers or employees in multinational corporations. India also has a small business presence in Turkey through representative offices of Reliance Industries, Tata Motors and Indorama.

Most Indians are Hindu and the community forms the bulk of Hindus in Turkey. In recent times, there have been efforts to promote tourism and culture from India as a means of developing the community and establishing better relations with Turkish society.

Ottoman Empire 
Indian Muslims went in waves from 1750 - 1857 from India to the Ottoman Empire and settled there and, intermarried with Ottoman Turks, there descendant today call themself Hintli-Türkler (Indo-Turkic people), Some Muslim Roma wet families in Istanbul who deny their Roma origins claim to be the descendants of this Indian Muslim Merchants. The Abdal of Turkey are also of Indo-Turkic Background.

See also
 India–Turkey relations
 Turks in India
 Roma in Turkey

References

Asian diaspora in Turkey
Turkey
Turkey
India–Turkey relations